"The 59th Street Bridge Song (Feelin' Groovy)" is a song by folk rock duo Simon & Garfunkel, written by Paul Simon and originally released on their 1966 album Parsley, Sage, Rosemary and Thyme. Cash Box called it a "sparkling, spirited lid."

The song is named for the Queensboro Bridge which spans the East River between the New York City boroughs of Manhattan and Queens, 59th Street Bridge being a popular unofficial alternate name for that landmark whose Manhattan end is located between 59th and 60th Streets. Reportedly the song came to Paul Simon during a daybreak walk across the Queensboro Bridge: the line: "Just kicking down the cobblestones" refers to the paving at the approach to the bridge's Queens' end, while "Hello lamppost, what'cha knowing" refers to either of two bronze lampposts one of which stood at both the bridge's Manhattan and Queens' ends, the latter being removed circa 1975. Simon opted to entitle the song after its site of inspiration rather than its prominent "Feelin' Groovy" hook line "Feelin' Groovy", Simon balking at labeling one of his songs with such a lowbrow turn of phrase: however "The 59th Street Bridge Song" would be tracklisted on the Parsley, Sage, Rosemary and Thyme album with "Feelin' Groovy" as its parenthetical subtitle.

As recorded for the Parsley, Sage, Rosemary and Thyme album, "The 59th Street Bridge Song" features Dave Brubeck Quartet members Joe Morello (drums) and Eugene Wright (double bass). Although such a cheerful track might have seemed an obvious choice for single release the track's running time of 1:43 was deemed too brief to garner radio "add-ons". Simon would say of the song's brevity: "Sometimes I make a song purely an impression...When you've made your impression, stop. I don't want the [listener] to think [beyond] it's [being] a happy song." (Subsequent remasters, included on later reissues of Parsley, Sage, Rosemary and Tyme and such compilations as Old Friends, Tales from New York: The Very Best of Simon & Garfunkel, and The Essential Simon & Garfunkel, have a longer fade-out at 1:53.) The track would serve as B-side for the Simon and Garfunkel 1967 Top 20 hit "At the Zoo". In 1971 "The 59th Street Bridge Song" would have an A-side single release - with "I Am a Rock" as B-side - in several European countries.

Footage of Simon and Garfunkel performing the song at the 1967 Monterey Pop Festival is featured in the film Monterey Pop. During his 2018 farewell tour, Simon "penalized" himself for wrongly performing the lyrics to another song by singing this song, which he confesses to hating.

The theme song to the American children's television program H.R. Pufnstuf, originally composed by Sid and Marty Krofft, was found to closely mimic "The 59th Street Bridge Song" after Simon sued for plagiarism; his writing credit was subsequently added to the theme for H.R. Pufnstuf.

Covers and performances
 A popular cover version was recorded by Harpers Bizarre on their 1967 debut album Feelin' Groovy, reaching No. 13 on the Billboard Hot 100 and No. 4 on the Easy Listening chart. This version - which at 2:34 expanded on the Simon & Garfunkel original's running time, adding an a cappella choral section - was arranged by Leon Russell, who played piano on the track. The track also featured session musicians included Glen Campbell, Carol Kaye and drummer Jim Gordon, and also a woodwind quartet with a flute, oboe, clarinet, and bassoon. 
 Simon's former song-writing partner Bruce Woodley recorded a cover with his band The Seekers on their 1967 album Seekers Seen in Green.
 The song was covered by The Free Design on their 1967 debut album Kites Are Fun.
 The song was covered by Italian vocal band Quartetto Cetra on their 1967 single "La Ballata degli Innamorati / Tre Minuti", with Italian lyrics written by Tata Giacobetti.
 The melody was used by Nana Mouskouri in 1967 for her song "C'est Bon la Vie".
 A version by Brenda Lee appeared on her 1968 album For the First Time (Decca DL 4955).
 Mabel Mercer and Bobby Short performed this song at their 1968 Town Hall performance, documented on the live album At Town Hall.
 The song appears on the 1969 album The Live Adventures of Mike Bloomfield and Al Kooper; during the track's mixing, Simon added harmony vocals to the final chorus.
 Cochise recorded a rock/blues version on their self-titled debut LP (1970)
 Jazz vocalist Johnny Hartman recorded it on his 1973 album I've Been There.
 The song was covered by Berni Flint and Lena Zavaroni on her television series Lena Zavaroni and Music (1979).
The Coolies covered it on their 1986 album dig..?, along with eight other tongue-in-cheek covers of Simon & Garfunkel classics.
 Pizzicato Five made a Japanese-language version of the song, included on both the single The Audrey Hepburn Complex and the album Pizzicatomania!.
 The song was covered by the Boston band Jim's Big Ego for their album Don't Get Smart.
 Jazz saxophonist Paul Desmond recorded the song on his album Bridge Over Troubled Water, consisting of all Simon and Garfunkel compositions.
 The Grateful Dead were known to have quoted portions of the song in their music; the most notable instance was within the performance of "Dark Star" on 13 February 1970 at the Fillmore East in New York, NY on the Dick's Picks Volume 4 album.
 O.A.R. have been covering this song in concert since 2002; they play their own arrangement which always serves as an intro to fan favorites "That Was a Crazy Game of Poker" or "City on Down".
 The song was parodied by Bob Rivers as "Feelin' Boobies".
 Tori Amos performed the original song at several of her concerts in 2005.
 The song was covered by Rachael MacFarlane on her 2012 debut album Hayley Sings.
 During live performances, Led Zeppelin guitarist Jimmy Page would often include snippets of "The 59th Street Bridge Song" in the guitar solo of the song "Heartbreaker". While usually edited out of official live releases, the snippet can be heard on numerous Led Zeppelin bootleg recordings.

In popular culture
 The cover version of the 1969 album Switched-On Rock by the Electronic group "The Moog Machine" was used as the theme for Dr. Chapatín, a character created by Chespirito.
 In 1991, Harpers Bizarre's cover of the song was featured in an episode of The Wonder Years (season 5, episode 10), "Pfeiffer's Choice".
 The song was used in a 2003 series of Gap commercials featuring R&B/soul singers Angie Stone and Mýa.
 The song was used in the first season of US TV series Desperate Housewives, during a scene where Lynette Scavo hallucinates her own suicide.
 In an episode of The Simpsons (season 6, episode 25) titled "Who Shot Mr. Burns? (Part One)", Mr. Burns alludes to the song, saying, "Hello lamppost, whatcha knowin'? I've come to watch your power flowin'."
 The song was used in the trailer for Hal Ashby's 1975 comedy-drama Shampoo for which Paul Simon composed the original score.
 The song was used in the season 3 premiere of The Leftovers (season 3, episode 1) called "The Book of Kevin". Protagonist Kevin Garvey asphyxiates himself with plastic wrap and duct tape in his room as the song plays.
 A variant of the song was performed by Paul Simon and Stephen Colbert as the opening segment for The Late Show with Stephen Colbert on May 25, 2017.
In a season 1 episode of Animaniacs entitled "The Warners' 65th Anniversary Special", during an appearance on The Ed Sullivan Show the song is parodied as "Make a Gookie", in which Wakko encourages the general public to be humorous and make silly faces.

References

External links
"The 59th Street Bridge Song (Feelin' Groovy)" Lyrics from Paul Simon's official site

1966 songs
1967 singles
Columbia Records singles
Simon & Garfunkel songs
Song recordings produced by Bob Johnston
Songs about roads
Songs about New York City
Songs written by Paul Simon